The 1972 UCI Road World Championships took place from 5-6 August 1972 in Gap, France. Only two professional races took place due to the Munich Olympics.

Results

Medal table

External links 

 Men's road cycling results
 Women's road cycling results
  Results at sportpro.it

 
UCI Road World Championships by year
1972 in road cycling
Uci Road World Championships, 1972
International cycle races hosted by France